Young Aphrodites (translit. Mikres Afrodites) is a drama film of 1963 directed by Nikos Koundouros based on a script of Vassilis Vassilikos.

Plot
In 200 BC, a nomadic group of shepherds, in search of new pastures, leaves the mountains to settle close to a fishing village. The women of the village hide and the only ones to venture out are Arta, the fisherman's wife, and a twelve-year-old girl, Chloe.

Skymnos, a young shepherd, approaches Chloe who walks semi-naked around the rocks and the beach. Among the two children begins a tantalising game; as a sign of his affection, Skymnos catches a pelican for Chloe and mounts it on a gantry. On the other hand, although Arta initially rejects Tsakalos, she finally succumbs and the couple meets in a cave where Skymnos and Chloe can watch through a crack in the rock.

When the shepherds decide to leave, Skymnos refuses to follow them. Lykas, a mute teenage shepherd, finds Chloe and rapes her. At first Chloe struggles, but then apparently gives in to the sensations her first sexual experience is exposing her to. When Skymnos witnesses this scene, he unties the dead pelican, throws its corpse into the sea and allows himself to be swept away.

Production notes
Many of the actors were actually sheepherders. The film is based on the romance of Daphnis and Chloe.

Awards
 Silver Bear for Best Director (Berlin Film Festival) - Nikos Koundouros
 International Federation of Film Critics (FIPRESCI) Prize
 Thessaloniki Film Festival Award for Best Film and Best Director - Nikos Koundouros

References

External links 
 

1960s Greek-language films
1963 films
1963 drama films
Greek black-and-white films
Films directed by Nikos Koundouros
Greek drama films
Works based on Daphnis and Chloe